Mirza Saleh Shirāzi was a court intellectual and the first reporter in Iran. His newspaper, "Kāqaz-e Axbār" (literal Persian translation of the word "newspaper"), was first published in May 1837, under Mohammad Shah Qajar. The goal was to  communicate the decisions taken at the royal court and neutralize the activities of Fath-Ali Shah's children, who had then made claims to the throne.

Shirazi is also known for writing one of the first books in Persian about a Christian country under the title of Travelogue (Safarnāmeh). It narrates his court-sponsored trip to Europe via Iran and the Caucases between 1815 and 1819.

Travelogue 
The stated goal of his travels is to acquire foreign science, philosophy, languages, and to research their religion and law. Shirazi begins his travels from Isfahan and its suburbs to Kashan, and then from Qom to Tehran. Detailed account of landscape, roads, and the infrastructure of cities are accounted for as well as the structure of political authority. Shirazi writes on the extension of Shah's familial power across his territory; the Shah (Fath-Ali Shah) has 48 children and most of them hold authority over a wilayat. From Iranian cities, he goes to Russia via Georgia and the Caucasus. On his way to Georgia, he observes an Orthodox church and comments on their worship which in his opinion cannot be distinguished from idol worship―his visit to churches is a frequent occurrence that is repeated during his stay in England.

In Russia, Shirazi devotes more attention to writing about Saint Petersburg over Moscow. Among other things, he describes the city's infrastructure and buildings, its surveillance system—the procedures by which the police keeps track of who leaves and enters the city—and a health clinic which he finds impressive. He writes:

"Another building is a large health clinic where four senior doctors and eleven junior doctors attend to the sick without interruption. Whoever does not have a dwelling, including foreigners, natives, soldiers, and others—as soon as they reach the clinic—receive a bedroom. Then, the clinic's workers serve him and the doctors attend to his care, they prepare food for him and feed it to him. In essence, the clinic is a large room, and the pharmacists are busy making medicines. Whatever prescription the doctor writes is then prepared and given [to the patient]. All the clinic's expenses are the king's responsibility. They have built several other clinics based on this model, and the merchants and the city's elite finance them, and whoever is sick and is unable, can go there, and so long as he remains sick, he remains in the clinic..."

Analyzing Shirazi's architecture and urban observations in his travels in Europe, Dr. Vahid Vahdat, an architectural historian, argues that by projecting a domestically shaped utopia onto the "West," Shirazi's memoir took part in the formation of Iran's early experience of modernity.

Shirazi also accounts for the political histories of the places he visits. English political history from the tenth century onwards is described in some detail with a culmination of a narrative of progress around King George III. Shirazi does not specify sources for these accounts. In England, Shirazi pays visits to several cities, Salisbury, Exeter, Oxford, and London included. Aspects of social life in England are commented upon at length including their dress codes, gender roles, separation of domestic and work spheres, and the very charitable nature of the English who care for orphans and needy through volunteer social associations. Other covered topics include the education of elites, newspapers, the parliament, and military organization.

See also
History of Middle Eastern newspapers
Qajar dynasty

References

People from Kazerun
Iranian journalists
19th-century journalists
Male journalists
Year of birth missing
Year of death missing
19th-century male writers
19th-century Iranian writers
People of Qajar Iran